The 1921 Lafayette football team was an American football team that represented Lafayette College as an independent during the 1921 college football season. In its third season under head coach Jock Sutherland, Lafayette compiled a perfect 9–0 record, shut out five of its nine opponents, and outscored all opponents by a total of 274 to 26. Significant games included victories over Pittsburgh (6–0), Penn (38–6), and Lehigh (28–6). 

There was no contemporaneous system in 1921 for determining a national champion. However, Lafayette was retroactively named as the co-national champion for 1921 by the Boand System and Parke H. Davis. Other selectors chose California, Cornell, and Iowa as the 1921 national champion.  

Lafayette guard Frank Schwab was a consensus first-team selection on the 1921 All-America college football team. The team also included fullback George Seasholtz, who went on to play in the National Football League.

Schedule

References

Lafayette
Lafayette Leopards football seasons
College football national champions
College football undefeated seasons
Lafayette football